Bessel may refer to:
 Bessel beam
 Bessel ellipsoid
 Bessel function in mathematics
 Bessel's inequality in mathematics
 Bessel's correction in statistics.
 Bessel filter, a linear filter often used in audio crossover systems
 Bessel Fjord, NE Greenland
 Bessel Fjord, NW Greenland
 Bessel (crater), a small lunar crater
 Bessel transform, also known as Fourier-Bessel transform or Hankel transform
 Bessel window, in signal processing 
 Besselian date, see Epoch (astronomy)#Besselian years
 , a German merchant ship in service 1928–45, latterly for the Kriegsmarine

People
 Friedrich Wilhelm Bessel (1784–1846), German mathematician, astronomer, and systematizer of the Bessel functions
 Bessel Kok (born 1941), Dutch businessman and chess organiser

See also
 Bessell